Skotnice is a municipality and village in Nový Jičín District in the Moravian-Silesian Region of the Czech Republic. It has about 900 inhabitants.

References

Villages in Nový Jičín District